Roc Cafe is the third album by the Welsh rock band Crys. It was released in 1995 on the Fflach record label as a CD. It is no longer in print.

Track listing 

Nol i Roc a Rol
Gadael fi Lawr
Amser yn Nawr
Galw Mas
Cefnogwyr y Byd
Edrych am Nerth
Mor Unig
Gyd i Chi
Sych
Breuddwyd Mawr - Rhan 1, Rhan 2 
Diolch i Chi

Credits 
Liam Forde (Vocals, Rhythm Guitar)
Scott Forde (Bass)
Nicky Samuel (Drums)
Mark Thomas (Lead Guitar)

Crys albums
1995 albums
Welsh-language albums